Mark Doyle (born 19 November 1998) is an Irish professional footballer who plays as a winger or striker for League of Ireland Premier Division club St Patrick's Athletic, having previously spent six seasons at Drogheda United, where he started his career.

Club career

Youth career
A native of Skerries, County Dublin, Doyle began playing underage football with Glebe North in nearby Balbriggan, before moving to Drogheda United where he progressed through their under-17's and under-19's sides to the first team in their 2015, 2016 & 2017 seasons.

Drogheda United

2016 season
Doyle made his debut in senior football on 22 February 2016 in a Leinster Senior Cup match against Bohemians at United Park. His League of Ireland First Division debut came on 4 March 2016 when he came on as a late substitute in a 2–1 win over Waterford. He made 8 first team appearances in all competitions over the season as his side won promotion to the League of Ireland Premier Division.

2017 season
On 1 February 2017, he scored his first goals at senior level when he scored a brace in a 5–1 win over Cabinteely in a pre-season friendly. Doyle's first league start and first League of Ireland Premier Division appearance came on 7 April 2017 in a 2–1 win against Shamrock Rovers in which Doyle was named Man of the Match. His first competitive goal at senior level came on 13 August 2017 in a 4–0 win away to Evergreen in the FAI Cup First Round. Doyle's first League of Ireland goal came on 29 September 2017, scoring a late consolation goal away to Derry City after coming on as an 80th minute substitute. He ended the season with 2 goals in 16 appearances in all competitions as his side were relegated.

2018 season
During pre-season, Doyle discharged himself from hospital to attend a training session with the team due to his determination to earn his place in the starting 11, training with the tube from an IV drip still in his hand following treatment for a serious chest infection. He started the 2018 season off in fine form, scoring a brace in a 6–0 win in the opening game of the season against Athlone Town, as well as goals in an 8–1 win away to Wexford and a 2–2 draw with Galway United to take his tally to 4 goals in the first 3 games of the season. The season ended in disappointment for Drogheda as they missed out on promotion after being knocked out of the Play-Offs by Finn Harps at the semi final stage. Doyle scored 8 goals in 34 appearances in all competitions over the season.

2019 season
Doyle scored as many as 4 braces over the course of the 2019 season to help his side to a second-placed finish. Unfortunately for Doyle and Drogheda, they again tasted heartbreak as they were beaten in the 2019 League of Ireland Promorion/Relegation Play-Off Final by Finn Harps. He made a total of 29 appearances in all competitions over the season, scoring 13 goals.

2020 season
Doyle won the first medal of his senior career on 27 October 2020 when his side won the 2020 League of Ireland First Division title after a 2–0 win away to Cabinteely in the final game of the season. Doyle scored an impressive 13 goals in 18 league games to help his side to the title. On 1 November 2020, Doyle was named as Drogheda United Supporters' Player of the Year. In December 2020, he was named PFAI First Division Player of the Year for the 2020 season as well as being named in the 2020 PFAI First Division Team of the Year by his fellow players.

2021 season
On 20 August 2021, Doyle scored a brace in a 2–1 win in the Louth derby against Dundalk, a first win at Oriel Park in 9 years for Drogheda. On 19 November 2021, he scored against Shamrock Rovers in the final game of the season, his 50th goal for the club in what turned out to be his final appearance for them. Doyle featured in all 37 of Drogheda's games over the 2021 season, scoring 13 league goals to make him third top goalscorer in the division, behind Georgie Kelly and Danny Mandroiu. Following his form in his first season back in the top flight, Doyle was reportedly attracting interest from Scottish Premiership side Motherwell, as well as League of Ireland Premier Division rivals St Patrick's Athletic and Shelbourne.

St Patrick's Athletic
On 18 December 2021, it was announced that Doyle had signed for St Patrick's Athletic, following Drogheda United manager Tim Clancy to Inchicore for the 2022 season, becoming one of his first signings at the club. On 11 February 2022, he made his debut for the club in the 2022 President of Ireland's Cup against Shamrock Rovers at Tallaght Stadium, scoring in the penalty shootout as his side lost 5–4 on penalties after a 1–1 draw. On 18 February 2022, he scored his first goal for the club in a 3–0 win over Shelbourne at Tolka Park in the opening game of the season. On 14 March 2022, he scored a 25 yard half volley in a 2–0 win over UCD at Richmond Park. On 1 July 2022, he scored the final goal in a 3–0 win over his former club Drogheda United at Richmond Park. Doyle made his first appearance in European football on 21 July 2022 in a 1–1 draw with Slovenian side NŠ Mura in the UEFA Europa Conference League and was shown a straight red card in injury time for an off the ball incident. On 9 September 2022 he opened the scoring in a 2–0 win away to his old club Drogheda United to help his team to their fifth consecutive win.

Career statistics

Honours

Club
Drogheda United
League of Ireland First Division: 2020

Individual
PFAI First Division Player of the Year: 2020
PFAI First Division Team of the Year: 2020
Drogheda United Supporters' Player of the Year: 2020

References

1998 births
Living people
People from Skerries, Dublin
Sportspeople from Fingal
Association football forwards
Drogheda United F.C. players
St Patrick's Athletic F.C. players
League of Ireland players
Association footballers from County Dublin
Republic of Ireland association footballers